North Carolina Highway 177 (NC 177) is a  route in the piedmont region of North Carolina. The road runs from South Carolina Highway 177 (SC 177) at the North Carolina-South Carolina border, through the town of Hamlet to U.S. Highway 1 (US 1) just south of Hoffman and just north of Rockingham. NC 177 was created in 1961 as a renumbering of NC 77.

Route description
SC 177 becomes NC 177 at the North Carolina–South Carolina border south of Hamlet. The road runs through an area with many farms and forest until reaching US 74 (future Interstate 74) south of Hamlet. The road enters Hamlet along Cheraw Road and runs through the downtown area. The road exits Hamlet passing near Dobbins Heights and a large railroad yard. NC 177 then follows King Street to its end at US 1 next to the Rockingham Speedway.

History
NC 177 was created in 1961 as a renumbering of NC 77, around the same time Interstate 77 was being constructed in the state. The road has stayed the same since its beginning.

North Carolina Highway 77

North Carolina Highway 204

Junction list

See also

References

177
Transportation in Richmond County, North Carolina